The Western Desert cultural bloc or just Western Desert is a cultural region in central Australia covering about , including the Gibson Desert, the Great Victoria Desert, the Great Sandy and Little Sandy Deserts in the Northern Territory, South Australia and Western Australia. The Western Desert cultural bloc can be said to stretch from the Nullarbor in the south to the Kimberley in the north, and from the Percival Lakes in the west through to the Pintupi lands in the Northern Territory.

Languages
The term is often used by anthropologists and linguists when discussing the 40 or so Aboriginal groups that live there, who speak dialects of one language, often called the Western Desert language.

Country
According to anthropologist Robert Tonkinson,
Extending over a million square miles, the Western Desert... covers a vast area of the interior of the continent. It extends across western South Australia into central and central northern Western Australia (south of the Kimberleys) and south-western Northern Territory, and it includes most of the hill country in northern South Australia..The area is marked by an overall similarity in both climatic conditions... and physiographical characteristics. More important, however, is its delineation as a distinct culture area.. its Aboriginal inhabitants share a common language (with dialectal variations), social organization, relationship to the natural environment, religion and mythology and aesthetic expression. The term Western Desert, then refers to both a cultural bloc and a geographical entity.'

History of contact
Ronald Berndt estimated that, before the European colonization of Australia, the Western Desert peoples may have numbered as many as 10,000, but that by the late 1950s, their numbers were down to between 1,371 and 2,200.
Apart from the Canning Stock Route and the Rabbit-proof fence, white contact with this part of Australia was very rare, until the 1960s. Terry Long, a Native Patrol Officer employed by Weapons Research Establishment, observed:
<blockquote>No one had been out there. The desert, as far as the Department [WA Dept of Supply] was concerned... was an unknown, as it was to the whole of Western Australia. The Warburton Ranges [were] as far as anybody got. People in those days knew absolutely nothing about Aborigines.Terry Long, (WRE) to help "clear" the desert beneath the trajectory of the Blue Streak missile.'.</blockquote>

Dialect groups

 Antekarinja
 Kukatja
 Luritja
 Mandjildjara
 Martu
 Ngaatjatjarra
 Ngaanyatjarra
 Pini (Nana)
 Pitjantjatjara
 Pintupi
 Spinifex people
 Wongatha
 Yankunytjatjara

See also
 Anangu

Notes

Citations

Sources

 
 
 
 Dusset, Laurent (2005). Assimilating Identities: Social Networks and the Diffusion of Sections. Sydney: Oceania Publications, Monograph 57.
 Morgan, Margaret (1999). Mt Margaret: A Drop in a Bucket''. Lawson, NSW: Mission Publications of Australia  (out of print).
 Harrington-Smith on behalf of the Wongatha People v State of Western Australia (No 9) Page 4 of 112 http://www.austlii.edu.au/au/cases/cth/federal_ct/2007/31.html 5/17/2007 accessed 5 September 2009

Indigenous Australians in the Northern Territory
Canning Stock Route
Culture of South Australia
Culture of Western Australia
Indigenous Australian culture